

The Mustang Aeronautics Mustang II is a two-seat aerobatic sports airplane developed and marketed in the United States for homebuilding.

Design and development
Robert Bushby acquired the rights to the Long Midget Mustang in 1959 and four years later began development of a two-seat, side-by-side version. This eventually flew in 1966 and plans were made available soon thereafter. Rights to both the Midget Mustang and the Mustang II were sold to Mustang Aeronautics in 1992. 
A single engine in tractor configuration airplane, the Mustang II features cantilever low-wing, two-seats-in-side-by-side configuration enclosed cockpit under a bubble canopy, fixed conventional landing gear, or, optionally, tricycle landing gear.

The aircraft is made from riveted sheet aluminum with a rounded turtle deck and flat sides and bottom skins. Its  span wing employs a NACA 64A212                              airfoil at the wing root, transitioning to a NACA 64A210 at the wingtip. Standard engines used include the  Lycoming O-320, the  Lycoming O-360 and the fuel-injected  Lycoming IO-360 four-stroke powerplants. Standard fuel capacity is 25 US gallons, but optional wet wings increase the fuel capacity to 61 US gallons. Several other fuel tank options are available. A folding wing option may be installed.

Specifications

References

 
 
 Manufacturer's website - Mustang II History

External links

Detailed AVweb review

1960s United States sport aircraft
Homebuilt aircraft
Mustang II
Low-wing aircraft
Single-engined tractor aircraft
Aerobatic aircraft
Aircraft first flown in 1966